The Integrated Electronic Control Centre (IECC) was developed in the late 1980s by the British Rail Research Division for UK-based railway signalling centres, although variations exist around the world. It is the most widely deployed VDU based signalling control system in the UK, with over 50 workstations in control centres that manage many of the most complex and busy areas of the network.

IECC consists of a number of operator’s workstations with VDU/LCD displays which depict the control area and is semi-automatic using Automatic Route Setting (ARS) – a computer-based route setting system driven from a pre-programmed timetable database. ARS can also handle severely disrupted service patterns and assist the signaller in the event of train or infrastructure failures.

IECCs were developed as an alternative to the traditional switch or button panel control, which in turn replaced mechanical lever frames. From the start, they controlled Solid State Interlockings (SSIs), a software version of the traditional relay interlocking, but existing relay interlockings may also be controlled from an IECC. The system can control as many miles of track as required, but typically around 50–100 miles.

Recently, PC-based control systems, similar to the IECC have been developed and are sold by various signalling contractors, e.g. Westinghouse Rail Systems WESTCAD.

Early history

The concept of IECC was developed at the Railway Technical Centre in Derby during the 1980s, and in particular the initial software for ARS and SSI.

A contract for the development of an operational standard system was let in January 1987 to CAP Group, including the supply of a complete system for Yoker (Glasgow) and the ARS for the Waterloo area. This was the first time a software house became involved in railway signalling after competing against the main incumbent suppliers of GEC-General Signal and Westinghouse Signals Ltd.
 
The solution used off-the-shelf microcomputer technology (Motorola 68000 microprocessors and VME Bus) to host the sub-systems of IECC in high availability configurations linked via a duplicated Nine Tiles Superlink local area network. Subsequent contracts were let to CAP Group (became Sema Group in 1988) for further operational IECC systems involving the supply of turnkey hardware and software. These included the first IECC to go live at Liverpool Street in Easter 1989 quickly followed by York. In September 2020 the original Liverpool Street IECC was replaced with a new IECC Scalable system.

Later developments

As a result of UK railway privatisation in the mid-1990s, British Rail Research was bought by AEA Technology Rail, who took over the supply of new IECCs, support for the existing installed base, and enhancements to the hardware and software. In 2006, the AEA rail business became DeltaRail (now called Resonate Group), who have developed IECC Scalable which replicates all the functionality of the original IECC on a modern hardware platform and software architecture. Following a successful six-month trial at Swindon B in 2012, IECC Scalable is now the standard for new installations, starting with Cambridge where it controls the Ely-Norwich line which has been resignalled on the "modular signalling" concept for secondary routes.

List of IECCs in service as of 1 January 2017 

The following installations are not true IECCs of the BR/SEMA/DeltaRail design. They are VDU based signalling control systems with a similar "look and feel" but in most cases they do not incorporate Automatic Route Setting.
Some locations shown below are interim installations which will eventually move into larger signalling control centres, such as Leamington and Madeley, which in time will move to the West Midlands Signalling Centre.

References

External links 
Resonate Group Ltd web site
Hitachi Information Control Systems Europe web site
YouTube: Ashford resignalling TV News report
SimSig offers free IECC simulations for private home use
The British Power Signalling Register contains a full list of IECC and other signalling workstations (also interlockings and panels) on the UK main line Network, including those that are not listed above because they are no longer in service.

Railway signalling in the United Kingdom
British Rail research and development
Railway signalling control